Sparganothoides lugens is a species of moth of the family Tortricidae. It is found from southern Mexico to Costa Rica.

The length of the forewings is 8.1–9.2 mm for males and 8.8–11.1 mm for females. The ground colour of the forewings is pale grey, grey and brownish orange. The hindwings are grey. Adults are on wing from early June to mid-August in southern Mexico and in March and June in Costa Rica.

Larvae have been recorded feeding on various leaves and have been reared on lettuce.

References

Moths described in 1913
Sparganothoides